Spradley is a surname. Notable people with the surname include:

Benjamin Spradley, American boxer
Doug Spradley (born 1966), American-German basketball coach and former player
James Spradley (1933–1982), American ethnographer and anthropologist
Lola Spradley (born 1946), Speaker of the Colorado House of Representatives from 2003-2005